Robert J. Barber (born December 26, 1951 in Ferriday, Louisiana) is a former American football defensive end in the National Football League who played for the Green Bay Packers.  Barber played collegiate ball for Grambling State University before being drafted by the Pittsburgh Steelers in the 2nd round of the 1975 NFL Draft.  He played professionally in the NFL for 4 seasons and retired in 1979.

References

1951 births
Living people
People from Ferriday, Louisiana
Players of American football from Louisiana
Grambling State Tigers football players
Green Bay Packers players